Leonid Nikolayevich Kolesnikov (27 April 1937 – 17 November 2010) was a Soviet swimmer. He had his best achievements in breaststroke, winning a European title in the 200 m in 1958 and setting a world record in the 100 m breaststroke in 1961. He competed at the 1960 Summer Olympics in the 400 m freestyle and 4×100 m medley relay and finished in fifth place in the relay, swimming the breaststroke leg. Between 1958 and 1961 he set six European records: three in the 200 m breaststroke and three in the 4×100 m medley relay. In 1962 he won a silver medal in the medley relay at the European championships.

References

1937 births
2010 deaths
Soviet male swimmers
Soviet male freestyle swimmers
Male breaststroke swimmers
Olympic swimmers of the Soviet Union
Swimmers at the 1960 Summer Olympics
European Aquatics Championships medalists in swimming